Sippie Catharine "Sisca" Folkertsma (born 21 May 1997) is a Dutch footballer who plays as a forward for French Division 1 Féminine club Bordeaux and the Netherlands national team. She was member of the team that became champions at the UEFA Women's Euro 2017.

Career
In June 2021, while she was preparing for the 2020 Olympics it was revealed Folkertsma had agreed contract terms with French club Bordeaux.

Career statistics

International

References

External links
 
Senior national team profile at Onsoranje.nl (in Dutch)
Under-19 national team profile at Onsoranje.nl (in Dutch)
Under-17 national team profile at Onsoranje.nl (in Dutch)
Under-16 national team profile at Onsoranje.nl (in Dutch)
Under-15 national team profile at Onsoranje.nl (in Dutch)

1997 births
Living people
People from Gaasterlân-Sleat
Footballers from Friesland
Dutch women's footballers
LGBT association football players
Netherlands women's international footballers
Eredivisie (women) players
SC Heerenveen (women) players
PSV (women) players
AFC Ajax (women) players
UEFA Women's Championship-winning players
Knights of the Order of Orange-Nassau
Women's association football forwards
Footballers at the 2020 Summer Olympics
Olympic footballers of the Netherlands
Expatriate women's footballers in France
Dutch expatriate sportspeople in France
FC Girondins de Bordeaux (women) players
UEFA Women's Euro 2017 players